Christodoulos Kolomvos (born 26 October 1988) is a water polo player of Greece. He was part of the Greek team winning the bronze medal at the 2015 World Aquatics Championships.

He was a member of the team that competed for Greece at the 2016 Summer Olympics. They finished in 6th place.

He plays for Greek powerhouse Olympiacos.

See also
 List of World Aquatics Championships medalists in water polo

Honours

National team
  Silver Medal in 2020 Olympic Games, Tokyo
  Silver Medal in 2018 Mediterranean Games, Tarragona
  Bronze Medal in 2013 Mediterranean Games, Mersin
  Bronze Medal in 2015 World Championship, Kazan
  Bronze Medal in 2016 World League, Huizhou
  Bronze Medal in 2020 World League, Tbilisi
 4th place in 2016 European Championship, Belgrade
 4th place in 2017 World Championship, Budapest
 6th place in 2016 Olympic Games, Rio

Club

Olympiacos
Greek Championship: 2009–10, 2010–11, 2012–13, 2013–14, 2014–15, 2015–16, 2016–17, 2021–22
Greek Cup: 2009–10, 2010–11, 2012–13, 2013–14, 2014–15, 2015–16, 2021–22, 2022–23 
LEN Champions League runners-up: 2015–16 
ENKA

Turkish Championship: 2018–19, 2020–21
Turkish Cup: 2018–19, 2020–21

Awards
Greek Championship Rookie of the Year: 2009–10

References

External links
 

Greek male water polo players
Olympiacos Water Polo Club players
Living people
Place of birth missing (living people)
1988 births
World Aquatics Championships medalists in water polo
Water polo players at the 2016 Summer Olympics
Olympic water polo players of Greece
Mediterranean Games medalists in water polo
Mediterranean Games silver medalists for Greece
Mediterranean Games bronze medalists for Greece
Competitors at the 2013 Mediterranean Games
Competitors at the 2018 Mediterranean Games
Water polo players at the 2020 Summer Olympics
Medalists at the 2020 Summer Olympics
Olympic silver medalists for Greece
Olympic medalists in water polo
Water polo players from Patras
21st-century Greek people